Maiden's hair or maidenhair may refer to:

 Maidenhair (Wyeth Painting), a 1974 tempura painting by American artist Andrew Wyeth
 Maidenhair fern, several ferns of the genus Adiantum
 Maidenhair moss (Fissidens adianthoides), a species of moss 
Maiden's hair plant, any of several green seaweeds:
 Maiden's hair plant, several species of the genus Chlorodesmis
 Maiden's hair plant, several species of the genus Caulerpa
 Maiden's hair tree or ginkgo (Ginkgo biloba)
 Maidenhair spleenwort (Asplenium trichomanes), a species of fern